Out of Singapore is a 1932 American pre-Code drama film directed by Charles Hutchison and starring Noah Beery, Dorothy Burgess and Miriam Seegar. The film was re-released by Astor Pictures in 1941 as Gangsters of the Sea.

Plot
First Mate Woolf Barstow is a corrupt merchant marine officer crewing a cargo ship which sails the Manila-Singapore trade route. He and his henchmen intend to blow the vessel while it is off the coast of Luzon in order to collect the insurance premium.

Cast
 Noah Beery Sr. as 1st Mate Woolf Bartstow
 Dorothy Burgess as Concha Renaldo
 Miriam Seegar as Mary Carroll Murray
 George Walsh as 2nd Mate Steve Trent
 Montagu Love as Capt. Scar Murray
 Jimmy Aubrey as Bloater, Drunken Sailor
 Horace B. Carpenter as Capt. Smith
 Olin Francis as Seaman Bill
 Leon Wong as Boss Wong
 Fred Toones as Snowball, the Ship's Cook
 Frank Hall Crane as Capt. Carroll (as Frank Crane)
 Ethan Laidlaw as 2nd Mate Miller (uncredited)

References

Bibliography
 Pitts, Michael R. Astor Pictures: A Filmography and History of the Reissue King, 1933-1965. McFarland, 2019.

External links
Out of Singapore at the Internet Movie Database

Films set in the Philippines
Films set in Singapore
Seafaring films
1932 drama films
1932 films
American drama films
Films directed by Charles Hutchison
1930s American films